The Sherbrooke Castors or Beavers (in English) was the name of two different junior ice hockey teams in the Quebec Major Junior Hockey League and another team in the Quebec Eastern Provincial Hockey League. Both later franchises played at the Palais des Sports in Sherbrooke, Quebec, Canada.

Earlier Castors
The earlier Sherbrooke Beavers were a senior ice hockey team which won the 1965 Allan Cup, and previously played in the Quebec Eastern Provincial Hockey League, an amateur league and team from 1959 to 1962.

Original Castors
The Sherbrooke Castors (1969-1982) moved to Saint-Jean-sur-Richelieu, Quebec in 1982, named the Saint-Jean Castors. In 1989 they were renamed the Saint-Jean Lynx. In 1995 the team moved to Rimouski, Quebec to become the Rimouski Océanic.

This original Castors franchise won the President's Cup in 1975, 1977 and 1982. The second incarnation never won. The Castors played in the Memorial Cup in those three years, and came closest to winning in 1982, when they lost in the tournament final to the Kitchener Rangers.

Sherbrooke Faucons/Castors
The second Sherbrooke Castors team (1998-2003), originally the Trois-Rivières Draveurs, franchise moved to Sherbrooke in 1992 as the Sherbrooke Faucons ("Falcons"). The Faucons were renamed to Castors in 1998 and moved to Lewiston, Maine in 2003, to be renamed the Lewiston Maineiacs. The Maineiacs folded in 2011, and the City of Sherbrooke received an expansion franchise in 2012 in the form of the Sherbrooke Phoenix.

NHL alumni
The following Castors/Faucons later played in the National Hockey League:

Dmitry Afanasenkov
Norm Aubin
Alain Belanger
Yves Bélanger
Serge Boisvert
Paul Boutilier
Fred Burchell
Claude Cardin
Ron Carter
John Chabot
Dan Chicoine
Rejean Cloutier
Jean Cusson
Claude Cyr
Mathieu Dandenault
Gord Donnelly
Gilles Dube
Norm Dube
Norm Dussault
Jean-Francois Fortin
Ray Fortin
Gerard Gallant
Jean-Marc Gaulin
Jere Gillis
Alan Haworth
Pierre Jarry
Brian Johnson
Claude Larose
Fern LeBlanc
Rejean Lemelin
Jean Lemieux
Mario Lessard
Gilles Lupien
Drew MacIntyre
Jimmy Mann
Peter Marsh
Sean McKenna
Corrado Micalef
Richard Mulhern
Simon Nolet
Michel Petit
Noel Picard
Roger Picard
Pascal Rheaume
Dany Sabourin
Richard Sevigny
Bobby Simpson
Claude St. Sauveur
Radoslav Suchy
Jocelyn Thibault
Rick Vaive
Sid Veysey
Kurt Walker

References

Defunct Quebec Major Junior Hockey League teams
Castors
Ice hockey clubs established in 1969
Ice hockey clubs disestablished in 1982
Ice hockey clubs established in 1998
Ice hockey clubs disestablished in 2003
1969 establishments in Quebec
1982 disestablishments in Quebec
1998 establishments in Quebec
2003 disestablishments in Quebec